This is an incomplete list of Statutory Instruments of the Welsh Assembly. Statutory Instruments made by the Assembly are numbered in the main United Kingdom series with their own sub-series. The Welsh language has official equal status with the English language in Wales so every Statutory Instrument made by the Assembly is officially published in both English and Welsh. Only the titles of the English-language version are reproduced here. The Statutory Instruments are secondary legislation, deriving their power from the Acts of Parliament establishing and transferring functions and powers to the Welsh Assembly.

1999–present

1999
List of Statutory Instruments of the Welsh Assembly, 1999

2000
List of Statutory Instruments of the Welsh Assembly, 2000

2001
List of Statutory Instruments of the Welsh Assembly, 2001

2002
List of Statutory Instruments of the Welsh Assembly, 2002

2003
List of Statutory Instruments of the Welsh Assembly, 2003

2004
List of Statutory Instruments of the Welsh Assembly, 2004

2005
List of Statutory Instruments of the Welsh Assembly, 2005

2006
List of Statutory Instruments of the Welsh Assembly, 2006

2007
List of Statutory Instruments of the Welsh Assembly, 2007

2008
List of Statutory Instruments of the Welsh Assembly, 2008

2009
List of Statutory Instruments of the Welsh Assembly, 2009

2010
List of Statutory Instruments of the Welsh Assembly, 2010

2011
List of Statutory Instruments of the Welsh Assembly, 2011

2012
List of Statutory Instruments of the Welsh Assembly, 2012

2013
List of Statutory Instruments of the Welsh Assembly, 2013

Statutory Instruments of the Welsh Assembly
Statutory Instruments